Curragh Camp were prominent participants in County Kildare GAA championships, significant in Kildare GAA history. They won the Kildare Senior Hurling Championship seven times in 1938, 1940, 1941, 1942, 1944, 1948 and 1955. They also won the Kildare Senior Football Championship in 1948.
 
Gaelic games clubs in County Kildare